Tao may refer to:

Yami language (Taiwan)
Mubami language (New Guinea)